Qullpa Hirka (Quechua qullpa salty, saltpeter, Ancash Quechua hirka mountain, "salty (or saltpeter) mountain", also spelled Colpa Irca) is a mountain in the Cordillera Negra in the Andes of Peru which reaches a height of approximately . It lies in the Ancash Region, Recuay Province, in the northern part of the Cotaparaco District.

References 

Mountains of Peru
Mountains of Ancash Region